The rhythmic gymnastics competitions at the 2013 Mediterranean Games in Mersin took place between 29 June and 30 June at the Mersin Gymnastics Hall.

Athletes competed in 1 event, women's individual all-around.

Medal summary

Participating nations
Ten nations have applied to compete in rhythmic gymnastics. Lebanon has applied, but didn't send any gymnast.

  Andorra
  Cyprus
  Egypt
  France
  Greece
  Italy
  Slovenia
  Spain
  Turkey

References

 
Sports at the 2013 Mediterranean Games
Gymnastics at the Mediterranean Games
2013 in gymnastics
Gymnastics competitions in Turkey